Francis Notenboom (born 9 August 1957) is a Belgian archer. He competed in the men's individual and team events at the 1988 Summer Olympics.

References

External links
 

1957 births
Living people
Belgian male archers
Olympic archers of Belgium
Archers at the 1988 Summer Olympics
Sportspeople from Essen